WLCD-LP (98.7 FM, "The Dragon") is a radio station broadcasting an Urban Oldies music format. Licensed to Jackson, Tennessee, United States, the station is currently owned by Lane College.

References

External links
 
 

LCD-LP
Oldies radio stations in the United States
LCD-LP
Jackson, Tennessee
Lane College